Janet Clara Malcolm (born Jana Klara Wienerová; July 8, 1934 – June 16, 2021) was an American writer, journalist on staff at The New Yorker magazine, and collagist, who fled antisemitic persecution in Nazi-occupied Prague just before it became impossible to escape. She was the author of Psychoanalysis: The Impossible Profession (1981), In the Freud Archives (1984), and The Journalist and the Murderer (1990), among other books. She wrote frequently about psychoanalysis as well as the relationship of the journalist to subject and was known for her prose style as well as polarizing criticism of her own profession, though her most contentious work, The Journalist and the Murderer, became a mainstay of journalism-school curricula.

Early life 
Malcolm was born in Prague in 1934, one of two daughters—the other is the author Marie Winn—of Hanna (née Taussig) and Josef Wiener aka Joseph A. Winn, a psychiatrist. She resided in New York City after her Jewish family emigrated from Czechoslovakia in 1939, fleeing Nazi persecution of Jews. Malcolm was educated at the High School of Music and Art, then University of Michigan. At Michigan she wrote for the campus newspaper, The Michigan Daily, as well as the humor magazine, The Gargoyle, later editing The Gargoyle.

Career 
Malcolm was a literary nonfiction writer known for her prose style and her examination of the relationship between journalist and subject. She began working at The New Yorker in 1963 with women's interest assignments, writing about holiday shopping and children's books, as well as a column on home decor. She next wrote about photography for the magazine. She moved to reporting in 1978, which Malcolm attributed to her smoking cessation in a 2011 profile by Katie Roiphe: "She began to do the dense, idiosyncratic writing she is now known for when she quit smoking in 1978: she couldn't write without cigarettes, so she began reporting a long New Yorker fact piece, on family therapy, called 'The One-Way Mirror.'" Her preference for writing in the first person was influenced by New Yorker colleague Joseph Mitchell and she developed an interest in the construction of the auctorial subject as much as the objects it described, quickly realizing "this 'I' was a character, just like the other characters. It's a construct. And it's not the person who you are. There's a bit of you in it. But it's a creation. Somewhere I wrote, 'the distinction between the I of the writing and the I of your life is like Superman and Clark Kent.'" She turned this interest in the construction of narrative to a variety of subjects, including two books about couples (Gertrude Stein and Alice B. Toklas, and poets Sylvia Plath and Ted Hughes), one on Anton Chekhov, and the true crime genre, but particularly returned repeatedly to the subject of psychoanalysis.

Malcolm was elected to the American Academy of Arts and Letters in 2001. Her papers are held at the Beinecke Rare Book & Manuscript Library at Yale University, which acquired her archive in 2013.

Psychoanalysis: The Impossible Profession

In 1981, Malcolm published a book on the modern psychoanalytic profession, following a psychoanalyst she gave the pseudonym “Aaron Green”. Freud scholar Peter Gay wrote that Malcolm's "witty and wicked Psychoanalysis: The Impossible Profession has been praised by psychoanalysts (with justice) as a dependable introduction to analytic theory and technique. It has the rare advantage over more solemn texts of being funny as well as informative".

In his 1981 New York Times review, Joseph Edelson wrote that Psychoanalysis: The Impossible Profession "is an artful book", praising Malcolm’s "keen eye for the surfaces — clothing, speech and furniture — that express character and social role" (noting she was then the photography critic for The New Yorker). "It succeeds because she has instructed herself so carefully in the technical literature. Above all, it succeeds because she has been able to engage Aaron Green in a simulacrum of the psychoanalytic encounter — he confessing to her, she (I suspect) to him, the two of them joined in an intricate minuet of revelation."

The book was a 1982 National Book Award for Nonfiction finalist.

In the Freud Archives and the Masson case 
Articles Malcolm published in The New Yorker and in her subsequent book In The Freud Archives (1984) offered, according to the book's dust jacket, "the narrative of an unlikely, tragic/comic encounter among three men." They were psychoanalyst Kurt R. Eissler, psychoanalyst Jeffrey Moussaieff Masson, and independent Freud scholar Peter J. Swales. The book triggered a legal challenge by Masson, the former project director for the Sigmund Freud Archives. In his 1984 lawsuit, Masson claimed that Malcolm had libeled him by fabricating quotations she attributed to him.

Malcolm claimed that Masson had called himself an "intellectual gigolo". She also claimed that he said he wanted to turn the Freud estate into a haven of "sex, women and fun" and claimed that he was, "after Freud, the greatest analyst that ever lived." Malcolm was unable to produce all the disputed material on tape. The case was partially adjudicated before the Supreme Court, which held, against Malcolm, that the case could go forward for trial by jury. After a decade of proceedings, a jury finally decided in Malcolm's favor on November 2, 1994, on the grounds that, whether or not the quotations were genuine, more evidence would be needed to rule against Malcolm.

In August 1995, Malcolm claimed to have discovered a misplaced notebook containing three of the disputed quotes, swearing "an affidavit under penalty of perjury that the notes were genuine."

The Journalist and the Murderer 

Malcolm's 1990 book The Journalist and the Murderer begins with the thesis: "Every journalist who is not too stupid or too full of himself to notice what is going on knows that what he does is morally indefensible."

Her example was the popular nonfiction writer Joe McGinniss; while researching his true crime book Fatal Vision, McGinniss lived with the defense team of doctor Jeffrey MacDonald while MacDonald was on trial for the murders of his two daughters and pregnant wife. In Malcolm’s reporting, McGinniss quickly arrived at the conclusion MacDonald was guilty, but feigned belief in his innocence to gain MacDonald’s trust and access to the story—ultimately being sued by MacDonald over the deception.

Malcolm's book created a sensation when in March 1989 it appeared in two parts in The New Yorker magazine. Roundly criticized upon first publication, the book is still controversial, although it has come to be regarded as a classic, routinely assigned to journalism students. It ranks ninety-seventh in The Modern Library's list of the twentieth century's "100 Best Works of Nonfiction". Douglas McCollum wrote in the Columbia Journalism Review, "In the decade after Malcolm's essay appeared, her once controversial theory became received wisdom."

Further Books 
In the posthumously published Still pictures: On Photography and Memory Malcolm writes autobiographical sketches, starting the chapters from family photographs.

Reception 

Malcolm's penchant for controversial subjects and tendency to insert her views into the narrative brought her both admirers and critics. "Leaning heavily on the techniques of psychoanalysis, she probes not only actions and reactions but motivations and intent; she pursues literary analysis like a crime drama and courtroom battles like novels," wrote Cara Parks in The New Republic in April 2013. Parks praised Malcolm's "intensely intellectual style" as well as her "sharpness and creativity."

But in Esquire, Tom Junod characterized Malcolm as "a self-hater whose work has managed to speak for the self-hatred (not to mention the class issues) of a profession that has designs on being 'one of the professions' but never will be." Junod found her to be devoid of "journalistic sympathy" and observed: "Very few journalists are more animated by malice than Janet Malcolm.” Junod himself, however, has been criticized for a number of journalistic duplicities, including a smirking piece in Esquire which outed the actor Kevin Spacey, as well as a similarly homophobic faux profile of the singer Michael Stipe.

Katie Roiphe summarized the tension between these polarized views, writing in 2011, "Malcolm's work, then, occupies that strange glittering territory between controversy and the establishment: she is both a grande dame of journalism, and still, somehow, its enfant terrible."

Charles Finch wrote in 2023 "it seems safe to say that the two most important long-form journalists this country produced in the second half of the last century were Joan Didion and Janet Malcolm."

Personal life
She met her first husband, Donald Malcolm, at the University of Michigan, and after graduation they moved to Washington, D.C., and Janet occasionally reviewed books for The New Republic, before returning to New York. Donald reviewed books for The New Yorker in the 1950s and 1960s and served as a theater critic. They had a daughter, Anne, in 1963. Donald Malcolm died in 1975.

Malcolm's second husband was long-time New Yorker editor Gardner Botsford, a member of the family that had originally funded The New Yorker. The author of A Life of Privilege, Mostly: A Memoir, he died at age 87 in September 2004.

Death
Malcolm died from lung cancer at the age of 86 on June 16, 2021, at a hospital in Manhattan.

Works

Non-fiction

 Reissued in 2002 with an afterword by Janet Malcolm by New York Review Books.

Essay collections

Photography

As editor

 Chekhov, Anton (2018). The Lady with the Little Dog and Other Stories. Translated by Constance Garnett; selected, with a preface by Janet Malcolm. riverrun.
 — (2020).  The Duel and other stories. Translated by Constance Garnett; selected, with a preface by Janet Malcolm. riverrun.
 — (2020).  Ward No. 6 and other stories. Translated by Constance Garnett; selected, with a preface by Janet Malcolm. riverrun.

Awards and honors
1982 - National Book Award for Nonfiction finalist for Psychoanlysis: The Impossible Profession
2001 - election to the American Academy of Arts and Letters
2008 - PEN/Jacqueline Bograd Weld Award for Biography, Two Lives: Gertrude and Alice
2013 - National Book Critics Circle Award (Criticism) shortlist for Forty-One False Starts
2017 - American Academy of Arts and Letters Gold Medal for Belles Lettres and Criticism

References

External links 
 Malcolm archive from The New Yorker 
Malcolm archive from The New York Review of Books
 Janet Malcom Papers. Yale Collection of American Literature, Beinecke Rare Book and Manuscript Library.

1934 births
2021 deaths
Writers from Prague
American people of Czech-Jewish descent
American legal writers
American women journalists
Czechoslovak emigrants to the United States
Jewish American writers
Members of the American Academy of Arts and Letters
The New Yorker staff writers
University of Michigan alumni
Deaths from lung cancer in New York (state)
21st-century American Jews
21st-century American women